Daytona Beach, or simply Daytona, is a coastal resort city in east-central Florida. Located on the eastern edge of Volusia County near the Atlantic coastline, its population was 72,647 at the 2020 census. It is part of the Deltona–Daytona Beach–Ormond Beach metropolitan area which has a population of about 600,000 and is also a principal city of the Fun Coast region of Florida.

Daytona Beach is historically known for its beach, where the hard-packed sand allows motorized vehicles on the beach in restricted areas. This hard-packed sand made Daytona Beach a mecca for motorsports, and the old Daytona Beach and Road Course hosted races for over 50 years. This was replaced in 1959 by Daytona International Speedway. The city is also the headquarters of NASCAR.

Daytona Beach hosts large groups of out-of-towners during the year, who visit the city for various events, notably Speedweeks in early February when over 200,000 NASCAR fans come to attend the season-opening Daytona 500. Other events include the NASCAR Coke Zero Sugar 400 race in August, Bike Week in early March, Biketoberfest in late October, and the 24 Hours of Daytona endurance race in January.

History

The area where Daytona Beach is located was once inhabited by the indigenous Timucuan Indians who lived in fortified villages. The Timucuas were nearly exterminated by contact with Europeans through war, enslavement and disease and became extinct as a racial entity through assimilation and attrition during the 18th century. The Seminole Indians, descendants of Creek Indians from Georgia and Alabama, frequented the area prior to the Second Seminole War.

During the era of British rule of Florida between 1763 and 1783, the King's Road passed through present-day Daytona Beach. The road extended from Saint Augustine, the capital of East Florida, to Andrew Turnbull's experimental colony in New Smyrna. This land grant encompassed the area that would become Daytona Beach. Williams built a slave-labor-based plantation to grow cotton, rice and sugar cane. His son Samuel Hill Williams would abandon the plantation during the Second Seminole War, when the Seminoles burned it to the ground.

The area now known as the Daytona Beach Historical District was once the Orange Grove Plantation, a citrus and sugar cane plantation granted to Samuel Williams in 1787. The plantation was situated on the west bank of the tidal channel known as the Halifax River, 12 miles north of Mosquito Inlet. Williams was a British loyalist from North Carolina who fled to the Bahamas with his family until the Spanish reopened Florida to non-Spanish immigration. After his death in 1810, the plantation was run by his family until it was burned down in 1835. In 1871, Mathias Day Jr. of Mansfield, Ohio, purchased the 3,200-acre tract of the former Orange Grove Plantation. He built a hotel around which the initial section of town arose. In 1872, due to financial troubles, Day lost title to his land; nonetheless, residents decided to name the city Daytona in his honor, and incorporated the town in 1876.

In 1886, the St. Johns & Halifax River Railway arrived in Daytona.  The line would be purchased in 1889 by Henry M. Flagler, who made it part of his Florida East Coast Railway.  The separate towns of Daytona, Daytona Beach, Kingston, and Seabreeze merged as "Daytona Beach" in 1926, at the urging of civic leader J. B. Kahn and others.  By the 1920s, it was dubbed "The World's Most Famous Beach".

Daytona's wide beach of smooth, compacted sand attracted automobile and motorcycle races beginning in 1902, as pioneers in the industry tested their inventions. Land speed racers from Barney Oldfield to Henry Segrave to Malcolm Campbell would visit Daytona repeatedly and make the  beach course famous.

On March 8, 1936, the first stock car race was held on the Daytona Beach Road Course, located in the present-day Town of Ponce Inlet. In 1958, William France Sr. and NASCAR created the Daytona International Speedway to replace the beach course.

Geography

Daytona Beach is located at 29°12′N 81°2′W (29.2073, −81.0379).

The city of Daytona Beach is split in two by the Halifax River lagoon, part of the Intracoastal Waterway, and sits on the Atlantic Ocean. It is bordered on the north by Holly Hill and Ormond Beach and on the south by Daytona Beach Shores, South Daytona and Port Orange.

Climate 
Daytona Beach has a humid subtropical climate (Köppen climate classification Cfa), which is typical of the Gulf and South Atlantic states. As is typical of much of Florida, there are two seasons in Daytona Beach; the warmer, wetter season (late May through October) and the cooler and drier season (November through April). 
 
In summer, temperatures are relatively stable and there is an average of only 8 days annually with a maximum at or above ; the last  reading was seen on August 2, 1999. The Bermuda High pumps hot and unstable tropical air from the Bahamas and Gulf of Mexico, resulting in daily, but brief thundershowers.

In winter, Daytona Beach has weather conditions typical of other cities on the Florida peninsula. It is the only month where the average high temperature falls below . Occasional cold fronts can bring freezes, which from 1991 to 2020 were seen on an average of 3.0 nights annually; however, minima below  are very rare, and were last seen on December 28, 2010. Like much of Florida, Daytona Beach often can be very dry in late winter and early spring, and brush fires and water restrictions can be an issue.

Hurricanes and tornadoes 

Typically tropical cyclones pass offshore once they reach the northern portion of the Atlantic coast of Florida. As such, the hurricane risk for Daytona Beach is significantly lower than areas of southern Florida like Miami and Key West. The 2004 hurricane season was by far the most active in the Daytona Beach area in the last 50 years. However, since 1950 there has only been one direct hit by a tropical cyclone to the Daytona Beach area, Hurricane Donna in 1960.

Although Daytona Beach has a significantly lesser tornado risk than areas like the Great Plains and Midwest, there have been a few deadly and destructive tornadoes in the last 100 years in Daytona Beach area. Most recently, on February 22, 1998, a tornado killed three people, injured 70, and caused $31 million in damages.

Rogue wave
The wave's range was from Ormond Beach in the north, to New Smyrna Beach on the south. Sailboats crashed ashore onto cars and many people suffered cuts and bruises from glass and debris. Two people required hospitalization and 200 vehicles were damaged. Seventy five injuries were reported. The prevailing theory is that an underwater landslide caused the rogue wave, although others have theorized that it was the result of a squall line.

Law and government

Local government
Under Daytona Beach's commission-manager form of government, voters elect a City commission which consists of seven members who serve four-year, staggered terms. Six are elected by district, the mayor is elected citywide.

The city commission establishes ordinances and policies for the city. It also reviews and approves the city budget annually. The commission appoints a city manager, who carries out the will of the commission and handles day-to-day business.

Law enforcement

Law enforcement in Daytona Beach is provided by the 241-member Daytona Beach Police Department (DBPD) headed by police chief Craig Capri. In a unique and controversial program to help fund the Police Explorer program, run by a subsidiary of the Boy Scouts of America, T-shirts with the words Scumbag Eradication Team: Not in Our Town are sold at the police headquarters.

The T-shirts contain a caricature of Retired Chief Chitwood standing next to a toilet bowl with the legs of multiple individuals sticking out. The T-shirt has been cited in at least one lawsuit against the DBPD alleging police brutality, the lawyer in the case in which the client sustained broken ribs and a fractured eye socket during an arrest for an open container of beer, claims the T-shirt shows the DBPD condones violence.

The Volusia County Sheriff's office, headed by Mike Chitwood is a countywide law enforcement agency with 446 sworn positions, 438 civilian employees, 300 volunteers and an annual operating budget of $73 million that has jurisdiction in unincorporated areas of Volusia County and provides additional law enforcement support to Daytona Beach during such events as the Daytona 500 and aids in joint investigations of certain crimes.

The Volusia County Beach Patrol provides law enforcement as well as EMT services along Volusia County beaches including the beaches in the city of Daytona Beach.

Eminent domain case
The city of Daytona Beach made national headlines when it designated the several–mile radius around Main Street on the barrier island portion of the city as a blighted area and has targeted it for redevelopment by private developers. This follows the Supreme Court decision of the eminent domain case in Kelo v. City of New London, which upheld the right of municipalities to use eminent domain to take private property for redevelopment by private entities.

Federal, state, and county representation
The United States Postal Service operates a post office at 500 Bill France Boulevard in Daytona Beach.

The Daytona Beach Armed Forces Reserve Center is home of the Florida Army National Guard 1st Battalion, 265th Air Defense Artillery Regiment, Headquarters and Headquarters Battery, Battery D.

Daytona Beach is part of Florida's 6th congressional district. It is part of Florida's 25th and 26th State House of Representatives Districts and the 6th and 8th State Senate Districts.

Florida's 6th congressional district, which extends from the southern Jacksonville suburbs to New Smyrna Beach and includes St. Augustine and Daytona Beach, is currently represented by Republican Michael Waltz.

Demographics

As of 2010, there were 33,920 households, out of which 19.5% were vacant. As of 2000, 18.0% had children under the age of 18 living with them, 30.1% were married couples living together, 14.5% had a female householder with no husband present, and 51.6% were non-families. Of all households, 39.4% were made up of individuals, and 14.4% had someone living alone who was 65 years of age or older. The average household size was 2.06 and the average family size was 2.77.

In 2000, 17.6% of the population was under the age of 18, 16.6% was from 18 to 24, 25.6% from 25 to 44, 20.5% from 45 to 64, and 19.7% was 65 years of age or older. The median age was 37 years. For every 100 females, there were 99.7 males. For every 100 females age 18 and over, there were 98.5 males.

In 2000, the median income for a household in the city was $25,439, and the median income for a family was $33,514. Males had a median income of $25,705 versus $20,261 for females. The per capita income for the city was $17,530. 23.6% of the population and 16.9% of families were below the poverty line. Out of the total population, 34.9% of those under the age of 18 and 12.1% of those 65 and older were living below the poverty line.

Languages
As of 2000, English spoken as a first language accounted for 90.37% of all residents, while 9.62% spoke other languages as their mother tongue. The most significant were Spanish speakers who made up 4.01% of the population, while French came up as the third most spoken language, which made up 0.90%, and German was at fourth, at 0.86%, as well as, Arabic with 0.66% of the population.

Culture

The Museum of Arts and Sciences is the primary cultural facility for Daytona Beach and Volusia County.  Other museums located in the city include the Southeast Museum of Photography and the Halifax Historical Museum.  The Museum of Arts and Sciences is actually a collection of museums and galleries and includes the Klancke Environmental Complex, the Cuban Museum, Root Family Museum featuring one of the largest Coca-Cola collections in the world, the Dow American Gallery and the Bouchelle Center for Decorative Arts which together form what is probably one of the finest collections of furniture and decorative arts in the Southeast. It also includes the Cici and Hyatt Brown Museum of Art, which houses the largest collection of Florida art in the world. There are also changing exhibitions and a children's science center opened in 2008. Since 1952, the non-profit Daytona Beach Symphony Society has sponsored performances by U.S. and international orchestras, opera and dance companies each season at the Peabody Auditorium.

Beaches and parks

Cars can be driven on some of the beaches during daylight hours. There are more than ten waterfront parks in Daytona Beach. Thong bikinis are prohibited in all areas of Daytona Beach, with a penalty of up to $500 and 60 days in jail.

Sports

Daytona Beach is home to the headquarters of the LPGA, NASCAR, IMSA, International Speedway Corporation, in Florida.

Motorsports
The Daytona International Speedway hosts the annual 24 Hours of Daytona (Rolex 24 at Daytona) and Daytona 500 races, among other events.

Baseball
In addition to motorsports, Daytona is also the home of the Daytona Tortugas, a minor league baseball team of the Low-A Southeast who play at Jackie Robinson Ballpark; it was established in 1993 and currently has 6 championships.

Golf
There are a number of golf courses in Daytona Beach.
 Daytona Beach Golf Course: Two courses, North and South Courses designed in 1922.
 LPGA International: The golf club offers two 18-hole courses, Hills and Jones (originally Legends and Champions).

Special events 
The city attracts over 8 million tourists each year. Special events that draw visitors to Daytona Beach include:
Speedweeks (Daytona 500 NASCAR race, Rolex 24 sports car race, and others)
 Coke Zero Sugar 400, NASCAR race held on the first Saturday of July (formerly called the Pepsi 400 and the Firecracker 400)
 Daytona Beach Bike Week Daytona 200 motorcycle races, bike shows and biker reunion in March
 Spring break (date varies, usually the first and second week of March)

During motorcycle events (Bike Week and Biketoberfest), several hundred thousand bikers from all over the world visit the greater Daytona Beach area.  The city is also often associated with spring break, though the efforts of the local government to discourage rowdiness, combined with the rise of other spring break destinations, have affected Daytona's preeminence as a spring break destination. It is the destination of Dayton 2 Daytona, an annual event that draws over 3,000 University of Dayton college students since 1977.

Media

Newspapers
 The Daytona Beach News-Journal – Daily newspaper covering the Greater Daytona Beach Area.
 Hometown News – Weekly newspaper covering the Greater Daytona Beach Area.
 East Coast Current – Community Newspaper covering Volusia County. www.ECCurrent.com
 Orlando Sentinel – Newspaper and news site based in Orlando with a bureau covering Daytona Beach and Volusia County.
 The Avion Newspaper – Student college publication of Embry–Riddle Aeronautical University in Daytona Beach.
 The Daytona Times – Black newspaper covering Daytona Beach
 HeadlineSurfer.com – Internet-only newspaper covering the Greater Daytona Beach-Orlando Area.

Radio
AM
 WNDB, 1150 AM, Daytona Beach, News/Talk/Sports
 WROD, 1340 AM, Daytona Beach, Oldies
 WMFJ, 1450 AM, Daytona Beach, Religious
 WDJZ, 1590 AM, Daytona Beach, Adult Contemporary/Newstalk

FM
 WHOG-FM, 95.7 FM, Ormond Beach, Classic rock
 WCFB, 94.5 FM, Daytona Beach, Urban Adult Contemporary
 WQMP, 101.9 FM, Daytona Beach, Modern rock
 WIKD-LP, 102.5 FM, Daytona Beach, Campus Radio of Embry–Riddle Aeronautical University
W231CN, 94.1 FM, Daytona Beach, Urban Contemporary "HOT 94.1"

Television
 WESH, Channel 2, digital channel 11, NBC
 WDSC-TV, Channel 15, digital channel 24, Educational independent
 Central Florida News 13, Bright House Networks cable channel 13

Economy

A major part of the Daytona Beach area economy is involved in the tourist industry. Over 8 million visitors came to the Daytona Beach area in 2004.

The area's economy includes other industries besides tourism, such as manufacturing.  Daytona Beach has industrial sites within an enterprise zone and sites within a foreign trade zone adjacent to Daytona Beach International Airport. Prime Interstate 4 and Interstate 95 sites are available with access to road, air, rail and water transportation.

Companies and organizations that have their corporate headquarters or a major presence in the area:

 Brown & Brown
 Halifax Health 
 Halifax Media Group
 International Speedway Corporation
 Gambro-Renal Products
 Ladies Professional Golf Association
 NASCAR
 Embry-Riddle Aeronautical University
 TopBuild
 Cobb Cole
 DMW Delivers

Shopping
 Volusia Mall, 1700 West International Speedway Blvd. The largest shopping mall in Daytona Beach. Anchored by Sears, JCPenney, Macy's, and Dillard's.
 Ocean Walk Shoppes, 250 North Atlantic Ave. Open-air shopping center, located in the heart of the beach area.
 Tanger Outlets, located in the southeast quadrant of Interstate 95 and LPGA Blvd. The  retail center was completed in November 2016.

Top employers
According to the City's 2019 Comprehensive Annual Financial Report, the top employers in the city are:

Education

Primary and secondary schooling
Public primary and secondary education is handled by Volusia County Schools. Daytona Beach has two public traditional high schools, two middle schools and six elementary schools. Some of the larger private schools include Father Lopez Catholic High School.

Elementary schools
 Bonner Elementary
 Ortona Elementary
 Champion Elementary
 Palm Terrace Elementary
 R.J. Longstreet Elementary
 Turie T. Small Elementary
 Westside Elementary

Middle schools
 David C. Hinson Middle
 Campbell Middle

High schools
 Seabreeze High
 Mainland High
 Father Lopez Catholic High School

Colleges and universities

 Bethune–Cookman University
 Daytona State College
 Embry–Riddle Aeronautical University
 University of Central Florida, Daytona Beach Campus

Vocational schools
 The Airline Academy – Offers flight training for pilots and other airline professionals.
 Keiser College
 Phoenix East Aviation – Offers flight training for pilots.
 WyoTech (formerly AMI) motorcycle repair, and marine repair training.

Infrastructure

Health systems

Healthcare in Daytona Beach is dominated by Halifax Health (formerly known as Halifax Hospital). The Halifax Hospital Taxing District was established in 1927 by an Act of the Florida Legislature as a public hospital district. There are dozens of individual practitioners and Professional Associations (PA) in the Daytona Beach area.

Utilities
Basic utilities in Daytona Beach (water and sewer) are provided by the City Government.
 Florida Power & Light is Daytona Beach's local electric power provider.
 TECO/People's Gas is Daytona Beach's natural gas provider. 
 Spectrum and AT&T networks are Daytona Beach's local cable providers.
 AT&T (formerly BellSouth) is Daytona Beach's local phone provider.
The city has a successful recycling program with separate pickups for garbage, yard waste and recycling. Collection is provided by several private companies under contract to Volusia County, Florida.

Transportation

Airports

Passenger airline services are located at Daytona Beach International Airport (DAB), which is centrally located within the city adjacent to Daytona International Speedway.  The site was first used as an airport with terminals being constructed in 1952 and 1958.  The present facility was constructed in 1992 at the cost of $46 million, and includes both a domestic terminal and an International terminal. Despite the new facilities, DAB has found difficulty in attracting and retaining carriers; Continental Airlines, AirTran Airways, and United Airlines discontinued flights to Daytona in 2007 and 2008. LTU & American Airlines also serviced Daytona Beach during the 1980s and 1990s, both of which ended all flights in 1994 & 1997.

Current passenger airlines serving DAB include Delta Air Lines (with nonstop service to Atlanta) and American Airlines (with non-stop service to Charlotte). Both carriers offer connecting service from those cities to destinations worldwide. International flights from DAB fly to destinations in the Bahamas through air taxi and charter services Airgate Aviation and IslandPass; non-stop flights are available from DAB to Marsh Harbour, Treasure Cay, and North Eleuthera. Sunwing Airlines also operates seasonal flights from Toronto Pearson International Airport. DAB is also heavily used for general aviation, largely due to Embry–Riddle Aeronautical University, whose campus is located at the airport.

Larger airports nearby are Orlando International Airport and Jacksonville International Airport, each of which is approximately 90 minutes away.

Buses

 Daytona Beach is served by Greyhound Bus Lines, which has a terminal located at 138 South Ridgewood Avenue (US 1). The Greyhound routes from Daytona Beach connect with hubs in Jacksonville and Orlando.
 Votran is the local bus service provided by Volusia County.

Automobiles
Daytona Beach is easily accessible by I-95 that runs north and south and I-4 connecting Daytona Beach with Orlando and Tampa. US 1 (Ridgewood Avenue) also passes north–south through Daytona Beach. US 92 (International Speedway Boulevard) runs east–west through Daytona Beach. SR A1A is a scenic north–south route along the beach.

The Volusia County Parking Garage is located at 701 Earl Street at North Atlantic Avenue (SR A1A). The garage is strategically located, next to the Ocean Center, Daytona Lagoon, and across the street from the Hilton Hotel and Ocean Walk Shoppes. Over one thousand parking spaces are available inside the garage, which also houses an intermodal transfer station for VoTran.

Bridges
There are four bridges over the Halifax River (and Intracoastal Waterway) at Daytona Beach. They include (starting from furthest downstream) the Veterans Memorial Bridge (which carries CR 4050 traffic), the Broadway Bridge (which carries US 92 traffic), the Main Street Bridge (which carries CR 4040 traffic), and the Seabreeze Bridge (which carries SR 430 traffic). All four bridges charge no toll to traffic. In June, 2016, the Veterans Memorial Bridge was closed as part of a three-year project to demolish the drawbridge and replace it with a high span bridge.

Rail

Passenger railroad service to Daytona Beach was established no later than 1889 by the Jacksonville, St. Augustine and Halifax River Railway, predecessor of the Florida East Coast Railroad (FEC).  Long-distance trains such as the City of Miami and the South Wind (both from Chicago), East Coast Champion (from New York City) and the Havana Special (New York City) made stops at Daytona Beach. Long distance routes were diverted to Atlantic Coast Line Railroad and Seaboard Air Line Railroad routes on the Florida interior south of the Jacksonville Union Station, following the beginning of a labor dispute on the FEC in 1963.Atlantic Coast Line Railroad timetable, December 13, 1963, Table 14 Passenger trains continued calling at Daytona Beach until July 31, 1968, when the FEC terminated passenger operations system-wide.  The FEC currently operates freight trains through Daytona Beach.

Daytona Beach is served by Amtrak by way of a Thruway Motorcoach connection between the beachside and Amtrak's DeLand Station,  to the west.  There, the service connects northbound with train 92, the Silver Star, and train 98, the Silver Meteor.  Southbound connections from Daytona Beach are limited to Silver Meteor southbound train 97.  The DeLand – Daytona Beach service is Amtrak's only Florida Thruway Motorcoach route provided by a taxi-cab, rather than a bus.

Points of interest
National Historic Places

 The Abbey
 Mary McLeod Bethune Home
Bethune–Cookman College Historic District
Delos A. Blodgett House
City Island
City Island Ball Park
Cypress Street Elementary School
Daytona Beach Bandshell and Oceanfront Park Complex
Daytona Beach Surfside Historic District
Bartholomew J. Donnelly House
El Pino Parque Historic District
Amos Kling House
S.H. Kress and Co. Building
Merchants Bank Building
Olds Hall
Rogers House
Seabreeze Historic District
Seybold Baking Company Factory
South Beach Street Historic District
South Peninsula Historic District
South Ridgewood Elementary School
Southwest Daytona Beach Black Heritage District
Tarragona Tower
Howard Thurman House
Tourist Church
US Post Office
White Hall
S. Cornelia Young Memorial Library

Other points of interest

 Daytona 500 Experience
 Daytona International Speedway
 Daytona Beach Boardwalk
 Daytona Lagoon Water Park
 Halifax Historical Museum
 Jackie Robinson Ballpark
 Main Street Pier
 Mary McLeod Bethune Performing Arts Center and Visual Arts Gallery
 Museum of Arts and Sciences
 News Journal Center
 Southeast Museum of Photography
 The Ocean Center
 List of Registered Historic Buildings in Daytona Beach, Florida

In popular culture
Novels set in Daytona Beach include:
 Day Number 142 (1974) by Edgar A. Anderson
 Last Cruise of the Nightwatch (1956) by Howard Broomfield
 Kick of the Wheel (1957) by Stewart Sterling

There have been a number of movies based on Daytona Beach, usually with a racing theme. The most recent example was the 1990 hit Days of Thunder, parts of which were filmed in Daytona Beach and nearby DeLand. Chris Rea wrote the song "Daytona" which was in his 1989 album The Road to Hell. Suzi Quatro's song "Daytona Demon" is often believed to refer to the city. Also, about half of the video for the song "Steal My Sunshine" by Len was filmed at Daytona Beach.

Daytona Beach was also the destination of a group of plagued teenagers in the movie Final Destination 2.

Daytona Beach was also one of the settings in the 2008 film Marley & Me.

Daytona Beach was the setting of the Season 2 finale of the web series The Most Popular Girls in School.

Notable people

 Duane Allman and Gregg Allman, musicians
 Perry Baker, rugby player for U.S. national team
 Fulgencio Batista, 19th President of Cuba
 Pete Carr, musician
 Vince Carter, basketball player, 8-time NBA All-Star
 Ed Charles, former Major League Baseball player
 Bill France Sr., founder of NASCAR
 Roland G. Fryer Jr., economist; In 2007, at age 30, he became the youngest African-American to be given tenure at Harvard University
 Lee H. Hamilton former Indiana U.S. Congressman
 Danielle Harris, actress
 Carrenza Howard, baseball pitcher
 Zora Neale Hurston, writer, anthropologist
 Alex Kinsey, singer
 E. J. Kuale, professional football player
 Gary Russell Libby, art historian, curator, and former director of Museum of Arts and Sciences
 Ryan Lochte, swimmer, winner of 12 Olympic medals including six gold
 Martin Mayhew, pro football player and executive
 Mary McLeod Bethune, educator and civil rights activist
 Walter M. Miller Jr., author of A Canticle for Leibowitz Matthew Tyler Musto, musician
 Kevin Nash, professional WWE wrestler
 No Kum-sok, North Korean defector
 Ransom Eli Olds, automobile pioneer
 Pavlina Osta, radio host
 Josef Papp, engineer
 Kitty Pryde, rapper
 Glen "Fireball" Roberts, NASCAR driver
 Jackie Robinson, professional baseball player
 Bob Ross, artist and television host
 Galen Seaman, lawyer, Wisconsin State Assemblyman, and mayor of Daytona Beach
 David Sholtz, 26th governor of Florida
 Mike Skinner, NASCAR driver
 Marc-Aurèle de Foy Suzor-Coté, painter
 Howard Thurman, author and theologian
 Denzel Washington, actor
 Eric Weems, professional football player
 T. K. Wetherell, president of Florida State University
 Robert Wright, musical theater writer
 Aileen Wuornos, serial killer executed in 2002
 Smokey Yunick, mechanic and motor racing innovator

See also
National Register of Historic Places listings in Volusia County, Florida

References

 Citations 

 General sources 
 Kettlewell, Mike. "Daytona", in Northey, Tom, ed. World of Automobiles, Volume 10, pp. 501–503. London: Orbis, 1974.
 Northey, Tom, "Land-speed  record: The Fastest Men on Earth", in Northey, Tom, ed. World of Automobiles'', Volume 10, pp. 1161–1166. London: Orbis, 1974.

External links

 City of Daytona Beach
 Daytona Beach Chamber of Commerce
 Daytona Beach Convention & Visitors Bureau
 A History of Central Florida Podcast – "Leather Cap and Goggles", "Rum Runner"

 
1876 establishments in Florida
Beaches of Florida
Beaches of Volusia County, Florida
Cities in Florida
Cities in Volusia County, Florida
Populated coastal places in Florida on the Atlantic Ocean
Populated places established in 1876
Seaside resorts in Florida